Akli Tadjer (Arabic:آكلي تاجر), a Franco-Algerian writer, was born on August 11, 1954. In Paris, of Algerian immigrant parents. His first novel "Al-Tassili" was published in 1985, for which he won the "George Brasen Prize for Literary Creativity"

Biography 
Akli Tadjer was nicknamed the "a writer by chance". As he started writing by chance after his father wanted him to be a protection or policeman. He joined the world of fiction through the entrance of French newspapers and magazines. Then he became a teacher of literature in Paris schools. Tadjer began writing for the French newspaper "Le Monde" in the 1980s until he became one of the popular readers. What distinguishes his writings is the global dimension that is derived from reality. He held many positions as a teacher at the "École Normale Supérieure de" Journalism" (In English: Higher School of Journalism)  in Paris and as editor of many newspapers and magazines. As critics consider him to be a rising writer at the international Francophone level.

Al-Tassili 

The complexities of Algérianité (French-Algerian identity) is a common theme of Algerian literature. Al-Tassili opens with Tadjer's protagonist Omar returning to France, a symbolic representation of a return "home" to France from the "home" in Algeria. This is given a humorous twist when Omar jokes that his previous attempt at the "voluntary adaptation training course" had lasted only fifteen days, he says: "Algeria I blame you for not being able to hold on to me. I came with the secret ambition of successfully passing this voluntary adaption phase".

Works 
Some of his works include the followings:

 Al-Tassili (original title:Les A.NI. du Tassili ), 1985 (Won George Basin Prize for Creativity)
 Courage and Patience (original title:Courage et patience), 2000
 The Bag Holder (original title:Le Porteur de cartable ), 2002
 Alphonse, 2005
 Beautiful Memories (original title: Bel-Avenir), 2006
 One Day, 2008
 The Western, 2009
 The Best Way to Love (original title: La Meilleure Façon de s'aimer), (2012)

Awards 
 He won in 2016 the Bay of Angels Award for his novel "The Tango Queen".
 He won Morocco Award for his book "The Bag Holder" in 2002

References 

21st-century French writers
21st-century Algerian writers
1954 births
Living people